Extrapolations is an American anthology drama series created by Scott Z. Burns for Apple TV+. The series premiered on March 17, 2023.

Premise
An anthology series that depicts the effects of climate change on the planet through various different points of view through interconnected stories.

Cast

2037: A Raven Story

2046: Whale Fall

2047: The Fifth Question

Additional cast

Episodes

Production
It was announced in January 2020 that Scott Z. Burns had been developing an anthology series about climate change that had been nearing a series order from Apple TV+. It would officially be greenlit in December for a ten episode season.

Filming for the series had begun by October 2021 in New York City under the working title Gaia, with Burns serving as writer and director, and Meryl Streep, Sienna Miller, Kit Harington, Tahar Rahim, Matthew Rhys, Daveed Diggs, Gemma Chan, David Schwimmer, Adarsh Gourav, Forest Whitaker, Marion Cotillard, Tobey Maguire, and Eiza González cast to star. The series would now only run for an eight episode season. In November, Edward Norton, Indira Varma, Keri Russell, Cherry Jones and Michael Gandolfini were added to the cast. In January 2022, additional castings were announced including Murray Bartlett, Yara Shahidi, Diane Lane, Heather Graham and Judd Hirsch. It was announced in February 2022 that Ellen Kuras would participate in the directing of the series.

Reception 
The review aggregator website Rotten Tomatoes has reported a 44% approval rating with an average rating of 5.8/10, based on 27 critic reviews. The website's critics consensus says, "Extrapolations' civic-minded storytelling is so sprawling that it never coheres into a satisfying whole, although its sheer star power and good intentions make for a mildly intriguing lecture." Metacritic, which uses a weighted average, has assigned a score of 57 out of 100 based on 16 critics, indicating "mixed or average reviews".

References

External links

Upcoming drama television series
2020s American anthology television series
2020s American drama television series
Apple TV+ original programming
Climate change in fiction
English-language television shows
Television shows filmed in New York City
Works by Scott Z. Burns